Dog Boy (stylized in all caps) is the debut studio album by American Long Island-based trap metal artist ZillaKami. It was released on September 17, 2021, via Republic Records. Production was handled by 6 record producers, including Thraxx, Yung Germ, Beatzvader, Shoki, Eleusis, and CRCL. It features guest appearances from Denzel Curry and Lil Uzi Vert, as well as additional vocals from Slipknot lead vocalist Corey Taylor.

Release and promotion
The album was promoted by four singles: "Chains", "BADASS" (with Lil Uzi Vert), "Frosty", and "Not Worth It". The album's promotion included several music videos for each of the singles (with the exception of "BADASS", the album's second single).

The album's debut saw the 2nd most streams in the U.S. from September 17-19 on Spotify.

Musical style 
The album is described as grunge, trap metal, and rap rock. The album features transitions between more hard hitting, louder tracks and softer, melodic tracks.

The album was heavily influenced off of Title Fight and their fourth studio album, Hyperview.

Track listing

References

2021 debut albums
Republic Records albums
Rap rock albums by American artists
Grunge albums